Tokelau is a dependent territory of New Zealand in Polynesia in the Pacific Ocean, comprising three coral atolls with a total land area of . There are 33 species of birds that have been recorded from Tokelau, of which one has been introduced by humans. Additionally, Anas ducks are also seasonal visitors to the islands. The most common species in Tokelau are the black noddy, brown noddy, and white tern, which each have populations of thousands of pairs on each of the atolls. Three species of birds found in Tokelau, the bristle-thighed curlew, bar-tailed godwit, and flesh-footed shearwater, are near-threatened. One of the species, the Australian masked-owl, is locally extinct. Before the arrival of humans, Tokelau may also have been inhabited by Halcyon kingfishers, Gallirallus and Porzana rails, Acrocephalus warblers, Aplonis starlings, Prosobonia sandpipers, and fruit doves.

The atolls consist of coral rubble of different sizes, with poor quality soil overlying coral rock. Plant diversity is low, with forest on the inner side of the atolls comprising mainly coconut palm, with other tropical trees like Cordia subcordata, Pisonia grandis, Guettarda speciosa, and Pandanus also being present. Undergrowth mainly consists of bird's-nest fern (Asplenium nidus). Vegetation nearer the beach is more diverse, with very little soil and plants like Scaevola taccada and Morinda citrifolia.

This list's taxonomic treatment (designation and sequence of orders, families and species) and nomenclature (common and scientific names) follow the conventions of the 2022 edition of The Clements Checklist of Birds of the World. The family accounts at the beginning of each heading reflect this taxonomy, as do the species counts found in each family account. Introduced and accidental species are included in the total counts for Tokelau.

The following tags have been used to highlight several categories. Not all species fall into one of these categories. Those that do not are commonly occurring native species.

(A) Accidental – a species that rarely or accidentally occurs in Tokelau
(I) Introduced – a species introduced to Tokelau as a consequence, direct or indirect, of human actions
(Ex) Extirpated – a species that no longer occurs here although populations may exist elsewhere

Pheasants, grouse, and allies
Order: GalliformesFamily: Phasianidae

The Phasianidae are a family of terrestrial birds which consists of quails, partridges, snowcocks, francolins, spurfowls, tragopans, monals, pheasants, peafowls and jungle fowls. In general, they are plump (although they vary in size) and have broad, relatively short wings. 

Red junglefowl, Gallus gallus (I)

Pigeons and doves

Order: ColumbiformesFamily: Columbidae

Pigeons and doves are stout-bodied birds with short necks and short slender bills with a fleshy cere.

Pacific imperial-pigeon, Ducula pacifica

Cuckoos
Order: CuculiformesFamily: Cuculidae

The family Cuculidae includes cuckoos, roadrunners and anis. These birds are of variable size with slender bodies, long tails and strong legs. Many of the species are brood parasites.

Long-tailed koel, Eudynamys taitensis

Plovers and lapwings

Order: CharadriiformesFamily: Charadriidae

The family Charadriidae includes the plovers, dotterels and lapwings. They are small to medium-sized birds with compact bodies, short, thick necks and long, usually pointed, wings. They are found in open country worldwide. 

Pacific golden-plover, Pluvialis fulva

Sandpipers and allies

Order: CharadriiformesFamily: Scolopacidae

Scolopacidae is a large diverse family of small to medium-sized shorebirds including the sandpipers, curlews, godwits, shanks, tattlers, woodcocks, snipes, dowitchers and phalaropes. The majority of these species eat small invertebrates picked out of the mud or soil. Some species have highly specialised bills adapted to specific feeding strategies.

Bristle-thighed curlew, Numenius tahitiensis
Whimbrel, Numenius phaeopus (A)
Bar-tailed godwit, Limosa lapponica
Ruddy turnstone, Arenaria interpres
Sanderling, Calidris alba
Wandering tattler, Tringa incana

Gulls, terns, and skimmers

Order: CharadriiformesFamily: Laridae

Laridae is a family of medium to large seabirds, the gulls, terns, and skimmers. Gulls are typically grey or white, often with black markings on the head or wings. They have stout, longish bills and webbed feet. Terns are a group of generally medium to large seabirds typically with grey or white plumage, often with black markings on the head. Most terns hunt fish by diving, but some pick insects off the surface of fresh water.

Brown noddy, Anous stolidus
Black noddy, Anous minutus
Blue-gray noddy, Anous cerulea (A)
White tern, Gygis alba
Sooty tern, Onychoprion fuscatus
Gray-backed tern, Onychoprion lunatus
Black-naped tern, Sterna sumatrana
Great crested tern, Thalasseus bergii

Tropicbirds
Order: PhaethontiformesFamily: Phaethontidae

Tropicbirds are slender white birds of tropical oceans, with exceptionally long central tail feathers. Their heads and long wings have black markings. 

White-tailed tropicbird, Phaethon lepturus
Red-tailed tropicbird, Phaethon rubricauda

Shearwaters and petrels

Order: ProcellariiformesFamily: Procellariidae

The procellariids are the main group of medium-sized "true petrels", characterised by united nostrils with medium nasal septum and a long outer functional primary flight feather. 

Southern giant-petrel, Macronectes giganteus (A)
Bulwer's petrel, Bulweria bulwerii (A)
Flesh-footed shearwater, Ardenna carneipes
Wedge-tailed shearwater, Ardenna pacificus (A)
Christmas shearwater, Puffinus nativitatis (A)
Tropical shearwater, Puffinus bailloni

Frigatebirds
Order: SuliformesFamily: Fregatidae

Frigatebirds are large seabirds usually found over tropical oceans. They are large, black and white or completely black, with long wings and deeply forked tails. The males have coloured inflatable throat pouches. They do not swim or walk and cannot take off from a flat surface. They are essentially aerial, able to stay aloft for days at a time.
Lesser frigatebird, Fregata ariel
Great frigatebird, Fregata minor

Boobies and gannets

Order: SuliformesFamily: Sulidae

The sulids comprise the gannets and boobies. Both groups are medium to large coastal seabirds that plunge-dive for fish.

Masked booby, Sula dactylatra (A)
Brown booby, Sula leucogaster
Red-footed booby, Sula sula

Herons, egrets, and bitterns
Order: PelecaniformesFamily: Ardeidae

The family Ardeidae contains the bitterns, herons, and egrets. Herons and egrets are medium to large wading birds with long necks and legs. Bitterns tend to be shorter necked and more wary. Members of Ardeidae fly with their necks retracted.

Pacific reef-heron, Egretta sacra

Barn-owls
Order: StrigiformesFamily: Tytonidae

Barn-owls are medium-sized owls with large, flat heads and characteristic heart-shaped faces. They have long legs with slightly curved talons.

Australian masked-owl, Tyto novaehollandiae (Ex)

See also
List of birds
Lists of birds by region

References

Specific 

Tokelau
Fauna of Tokelau
birds
'

General